"Home Again in My Heart" is a song written by Josh Leo and Wendy Waldman, and recorded by American country music group Nitty Gritty Dirt Band. It was released in October 1985 as the second single from their album Partners, Brothers and Friends.  The song reached number 3 on the Billboard Hot Country Singles chart in January 1986 and number 1 on the RPM Country Tracks chart in Canada.

Chart performance

References

1985 singles
1985 songs
Nitty Gritty Dirt Band songs
Songs written by Josh Leo
Song recordings produced by Paul Worley
Warner Records singles
Songs written by Wendy Waldman